Rajko Kušić (born 21 June 1955) is a Yugoslav judoka. He competed in the men's half-heavyweight event at the 1980 Summer Olympics.

References

1955 births
Living people
Yugoslav male judoka
Olympic judoka of Yugoslavia
Judoka at the 1980 Summer Olympics
Place of birth missing (living people)